Meridional French, also referred to as Francitan, is a regional variant of the French language. It is widely spoken in Marseille, Avignon and Toulouse and is influenced by the Occitan language.

There are speakers of Meridional French in all generations, but the accent is most marked among the elderly, who often speak Occitan as their first language.

Characteristics
The phonology, morphology, syntax and lexicon of Occitan have all influenced Meridional French, but the phonological effects are perhaps the most salient by producing the characteristic accent, which is used by speakers of Meridional French. Those effects include the following: 
 The loss of phonemic nasal vowels, which are replaced by an oral vowel followed by a nasal consonant
 the frequent realisation of the final atonal vowels of Latin, which are lost by speakers of other varieties of French, as schwa
 the presence of lexical stress on the penultimate syllable of many words, in contrast to the phrase-final stress of Standard French

Meridional French is also subject to a phonological law known as the Law of Position in which mid-vowels are subject to allophonic variation based on the shape of their syllables; they are realised as mid-open in closed syllables (those ending in a consonant) and as mid-close in open syllables (those ending in a vowel). The phenomenon has been shown to be somewhat more complex, however, by Durand (1995), Eychenne (2006), and Chabot (2008). The principle is strictly adhered to by speakers of Meridional French, in contrast to those of other varieties of French.

Phonology
 Lexical (or word-based) stress is used, unlike the prosodic stress of Standard French.
 Nasal vowels have not changed but are still pronounced as in traditional Parisian French or with a nasal consonant after the vowel: enfant , pain , timbre , bon  and brun .
 The "e caduc" is always pronounced by older speakers, even at the end of words. For example, cerise (cherry) is pronounced , tête (head) is pronounced , and it is sometimes pronounced even if there is no e; ciel (sky) .

Vocabulary
A number of words are peculiar to Meridional French. For example, péguer (Occitan pegar), "to be sticky" (Standard French poisser), chocolatine (Southwest), "pain au chocolat", cagade (Occitan cagat) or flûte (a larger baguette), known as a pain parisien (Parisian loaf) in Paris.

Some phrases are used with meanings that differ from those of Standard French. For example, s'il faut, literally meaning "if necessary", is used to mean "perhaps", which would be rendered in Standard French as peut-être. That is a calque of the Occitan se cal.

Internal variation
Many sub-varieties of Meridional French exist, with distinctive features.

Diatopic variation accounts for the differences between the French varieties spoken in the various areas of Southern France. Phonetics and vocabulary often change from one region to another.

Diastratic variation is also extant in Meridional French.

References

.
.
.

Macaronic forms of French
Occitan language
French language in France